George Patrick Ziemann (September 13, 1941 – October 22, 2009) was the third Roman Catholic bishop of the Roman Catholic Diocese of Santa Rosa in California.

Born in Pasadena, California, Ziemann was ordained a Roman Catholic priest for the Roman Catholic Archdiocese of Los Angeles on April 29, 1967. On December 23, 1986, Pope John Paul II appointed Ziemann auxiliary bishop of the Los Angeles Archdiocese and he was consecrated on February 23, 1987, by then Archbishop Roger Mahony. On July 14, 1992, Pope John Paul II appointed Ziemann bishop of the Santa Rosa Diocese. On July 22, 1999, Ziemann resigned due to sexual and financial improprieties. Bishop Ziemann died in October 2009.

Notes

Resources
Past Bishops of the Diocese of Santa Rosa Retrieved: 2010-03-17

Episcopal succession

1941 births
2009 deaths
People from Pasadena, California
Roman Catholic Archdiocese of Los Angeles
Roman Catholic bishops of Santa Rosa in California
20th-century Roman Catholic bishops in the United States